Nogometni klub Zagorje, commonly referred to as NK Zagorje or simply Zagorje, is a Slovenian football club which plays in the town of Zagorje ob Savi. They competes in the Ljubljana Regional League, the fourth highest league in Slovenia. The club was founded in 1923. Zagorje have a long-standing local rivalry with NK Rudar Trbovlje, which is known as the Zasavje Derby.

References

External links
Official website 

Association football clubs established in 1923
Football clubs in Slovenia
1923 establishments in Slovenia